Eurolines is a brand of intercity bus service owned by an international non-profit organisation formed under Belgian law. Using the Eurolines brand, partner bus companies operate service to over 600 destinations in 36 countries of Europe, as well as Morocco. It is managed by Flixbus.

History
Eurolines was founded in 1985. Its forerunner was the Europabus brand network created by the Union des Services Routiers des Chemins de Fer Européens (URF), a consortium of 11 European national railway companies, in 1951.

In January 2018, National Express Coaches withdrew from the Eurolines network, instead partnering with Ouibus.

In April 2019, the Eurolines operating businesses in France, The Netherlands, Belgium, Czech Republic and Spain, and the Isilines brand, all of which were formerly owned by Veolia Transport and later Transdev, were acquired by Flixbus.

In July 2020, Eurolines operators in France were placed into compulsory liquidation by a French court.

Operators
Austria: Deutsche Touring
Bosnia-Herzegovina: Centrotrans Eurolines
Croatia: Eurolines Autotrans by Arriva
Estonia: Eurolines Lithuania
Germany: Deutsche Touring
Ireland: Bus Éireann trading as Expressway Eurolines
Latvia, Lithuania: Eurolines Lithuania
Romania: FlixBus
Switzerland: Autourisme Léman SA (ALSA) and  Eggmann Frey AG
 Serbia: Lasta

References

External links

Showbus gallery

1985 establishments in Belgium
Bus operating companies
International bus transport in Europe
National Express companies
Transdev
Transport companies established in 1985
Veolia